The flag of Amapá is one of the official symbols of the state of Amapá, Brazil. The current flag was introduced by Decree No. 8 of 23 April 1984.

Symbolism 
Each color has the following meaning:

 The green represents the forests;
 The yellow represents mineral wealth;
 The blue represents the sky;
 The white represents peace;
 Black symbolizes the respect for those who died fighting for the state.

The centralized geometric figure on the hoist-side represents the Fort of São José de Macapá (pt).

Prior to the creation of the Amapá territory, the area was disputed between France and Brazil. Known variously as the Republic of Counani (1886–1887), Free State of Counani (1904–1912), and the Republic of Brezet, these territories were never internationally recognized, and ultimately quelled by the governments of France and Brazil.

The Federal Territory of Amapá established its own flag, which was used after the state's creation on 5 October 1988, and established by Decree No. 8 of 23 April 1984. However, due to disputes at the time, a tripartite version of the state flag of Pará, showing the fort of São José, was popularly used. This version only ceased to be used during the administration of Aníbal Barcelos (pt).

External links
 Símbolos do Amapá 

Flags of Brazil
Amapá
Flags introduced in 1984
1984 establishments in Brazil